Indulis Bekmanis (born 21 February 1989) is a Latvian professional road cyclist who last rode for .

Major results

2009
1st  National U-23 Time Trial Championships
2010
1st  National U-23 Road Race Championships
1st  National U-23 Time Trial Championships
3rd National Road Race Championships
5th Memoriał Henryka Łasaka
7th Tartu GP
2011
3rd National U-23 Time Trial Championships
8th Overall Baltic Chain Tour
1st Stage 2
2012
3rd National Road Race Championships
7th Overall Baltic Chain Tour
8th Tartu GP
9th Mayor Cup
2013
4th Overall Baltic Chain Tour

References

1989 births
Living people
People from Sigulda
Latvian male cyclists